Wang Min (born June 14, 1980 in Shanghai) is a female Chinese handball player who competed at the 2004 Summer Olympics.

In 2004, she finished eighth with the Chinese team in the women's competition. She played all seven matches and scored 19 goals.

External links
profile

1980 births
Living people
Handball players at the 2004 Summer Olympics
Handball players at the 2008 Summer Olympics
Olympic handball players of China
Chinese female handball players
Handball players from Shanghai
Handball players at the 2006 Asian Games
Asian Games competitors for China